Huddersfield Town's 1910–11 campaign was Town's first ever season in the Football League. After coming through the election process to enter Division 2, Town finished their first season in professional football in 13th place.

Squad at the start of the season

Review
On 13 June 1910, Town were elected into the Football League only two years after being formed. Their first match against Bradford (Park Avenue) resulted in a 1-0 win thanks to Henry Hamilton's goal. The season saw Town finishing in 13th place with 34 points in Division 2.

Squad at the end of the season

Results

Division Two

FA Cup

Appearances and goals

1910-11
Huddersfield Town